Lontara or lontaraq are Bugis-Makassar palm-leaf manuscripts that record knowledge on such topics as history, science, custom, and laws. The term originates from the Javanese/Malay word lontar, which is the name of the palm tree Borassus flabellifer that provides the leaves used.

The types of lontara includes
 attoriolong (bug) patturioloang (mak) – history
 bilang or kotika (bug-mak) – characteristics of each days of the week
 ade (bug) or ada (mak) – adat
 ulu ada (bug) or ulu kana (mak) – past treaties or texts between kingdoms or countries
 alopi-lopping (bug) – shipping adat
 pangoriseng (bug) or pannossorang (mak) – genealogies of the royals.

See also
 Lontara script
 Buginese language

References

External links
 Historical texts as social maps: Lontaraq bilang in early modern Makassar

Indonesian manuscripts